Bravi (sing. bravo; sometimes translated as ‘bravoes’) were a species of coarse soldiery or hired assassins employed by the rural lordlings (or dons) of northern Italy in the sixteenth and seventeenth centuries to protect their interests. The word derives, probably, from the Latin pravus (bad, wicked, evil) via the Spanish bravo, in the sense of violent, aggressive, savage, and impulsive.

Their fame—and their reputation as frightening and domineering bullies—rests in part on their striking presence in Alessandro Manzoni’s historical novel The Betrothed (1827), which became one of the best-known Italian works of fiction of the nineteenth century and which opens with an extended description of the phenomenon. They were not, however, a fictional invention: his research into local history enabled Manzoni to ascertain from the dates of publication of various proclamations against the bravi that they had been present in Italy from at least 1583 and  until at least 1632.

The bravi of The Betrothed 
The bravi retained by Don Rodrigo include Grignapoco, Griso,  Montanarolo, Sfregiato, Squinternotto, Tanabuso and Tira-dritto. It is not clear whether Biondino and Carlotto are armed or unarmed retainers.

Nibbio, who works for l'Innominato, has a multitude of bravi under his command but, like his master, they are nameless.

References

Notes
This article originated in part as a translation of its counterpart in the Italian Wikipedia.

Social history of Italy
16th century in Italy
17th century in Italy